HIPPI, short for High Performance Parallel Interface, is a computer bus for the attachment of high speed storage devices to supercomputers, in a point-to-point link. It was popular in the late 1980s and into the mid-to-late 1990s, but has since been replaced by ever-faster standard interfaces like Fibre Channel and 10 Gigabit Ethernet.

HIPPI usage dwindled in the late 1990s. This was partly because Ultra3 SCSI offered rates of 320 MB/s and was available at almost any computer store at commodity prices. Meanwhile, Fibre Channel offered simple interconnect with both HIPPI and SCSI (it can run both protocols) and speeds of up to 400 MB/s on fibre and 100 MB/s on a single pair of twisted pair copper wires. Both of these systems have since been supplanted by even higher performance systems during the 2000s.

GSN - HIPPI-6400 
In 1999 in an effort to improve the speed resulted in HIPPI-6400, which was later renamed GSN (for Gigabyte System Network) but this saw little use due to competing standards and the high cost of GSN. GSN has a full-duplex bandwidth of 6400 Mbit/s or 800 MB/s in each direction. GSN was developed at Los Alamos National Laboratory and uses a parallel interface for higher speeds.

HIPPI is the first “near-gigabit” (0.8 Gbit/s) (ANSI) standard for network data transmission.  It was specifically designed for supercomputers and was never intended for mass market networks such as Ethernet.  Many of the features developed for HIPPI were integrated into such technologies as InfiniBand.  What is remarkable about HIPPI is that it came out when Ethernet was still a 10 Mbit/s data link and SONET at OC-3 (155 Mbit/s) was considered leading edge technology.

See also

 GG45
 List of device bandwidths
 Optical communication
 Optical fiber cable
 Parallel optical interface
 TERA
 XAUI

References

Computer buses
Computer storage buses